Harry Rafter from Wakefield, was an English professional rugby league footballer who played in the 1910s and 1920s.

Notable tour matches
Harry Rafter played  left-, i.e. number 8, in Wakefield Trinity's 3-29 defeat by Australia in the 1921–22 Kangaroo tour of Great Britain match at Belle Vue, Wakefield on Saturday 22 October 1921.

References

External links
Search for "Rafter" at rugbyleagueproject.org

Rugby league players from Wakefield
Place of death missing
English rugby league players
Rugby league props
Rugby league second-rows
Wakefield Trinity players
Year of birth missing
Year of death missing